The 1998–99 Dallas Stars season was the Stars' sixth season in Dallas, Texas, and the  thirty-second of the franchise. They would defeat the Buffalo Sabres in the Stanley Cup finals to win the first Stanley Cup for the Stars in franchise history.

Offseason
Under a league-wide realignment from four to six divisions, the NHL moved the Stars from the Central to the Pacific Division. This resulted in the oddity of Dallas, a city near the longitudinal center of the contiguous of the United States and in the Central Time Zone, having none of its major professional sports teams in a "Central Division" despite the fact that all of the then-established major leagues at this time had divisions with some form of that name. This would temporarily change when the Dallas Burn of the then-new Major League Soccer were placed in a newly-formed Central Division in 2000, but MLS reverted to an Eastern and Western Conference format without additional divisions after only two seasons. The Stars would eventually return to the Central Division after the NHL returned to a four division alignment in 2013.

Regular season

The Stars finished the regular season with the NHL's best record and first overall in goals against, with just 168. They also tied the St. Louis Blues and San Jose Sharks for fewest short-handed goals allowed, with 4.

Season standings

Schedule and results

Playoffs

Western Conference Quarterfinals

Western Conference semifinals

Western Conference finals

Stanley Cup Finals

Player statistics

Regular season
Scoring

Goaltending

Playoffs
Scoring

Goaltending

Awards and records
 Presidents' Trophy
 Clarence S. Campbell Bowl
 Ed Belfour & Roman Turek, William M. Jennings Trophy
 Jere Lehtinen, Frank J. Selke Trophy
 Joe Nieuwendyk, Conn Smythe Trophy

1999 NHL All Star Game
Dallas Stars NHL All-Star representatives in the 1999 NHL All Star Game at the Ice Palace in Tampa, Florida.

 Ed Belfour, G, (North American All Stars)
 Mike Modano, C, (North American All Stars)
 Darryl Sydor, D, (North American All Stars)
 Sergei Zubov, D, (World All Stars)
 Ken Hitchcock, Head Coach, (North American All Stars)

Transactions
February 26, 1999 – Doug Lidster was signed as a free agent with the Dallas Stars.

Dallas Stars - 1999 Stanley Cup champions

Draft picks
The Stars' picks at the 1998 NHL Entry Draft in Buffalo, New York.

References
Bibliography
 
 Stars on Hockey Database

D
Stanley Cup championship seasons
Presidents' Trophy seasons
D
D
Dallas Stars seasons
Western Conference (NHL) championship seasons